Hélène Sofie Edlund (20 October 1858  30 June 1941) was a Swedish photographer.

In the 1890s, Edlund collaborated with Artur Hazelius documenting the buildings and nature of Skansen.

Her nineteenth century photographs of folk costume are used to decorate locker doors in the Nordic Museum.

References

External links

1858 births
1941 deaths
Swedish women photographers